Puncturella cumingii is a species of sea snail, a marine gastropod mollusk in the family Fissurellidae, the keyhole limpets and slit limpets.

References

 Poppe G.T., Tagaro S.P. & Stahlschmidt P. (2015). New shelled molluscan species from the central Philippines I. Visaya. 4(3): 15–59.
 Poppe G.T. & Tagaro S.P. (2020). The Fissurellidae from the Philippines with the description of 26 new species. Visaya. suppl. 13: 1-131

External links
 To World Register of Marine Species
 Adams A. (1853 ["1851"]). A monograph of the recent species of Rimula, a genus of Mollusca, belonging to the family Fissurellidae. Proceedings of the Zoological Society of London. 19: 226-227

Fissurellidae
Gastropods described in 1853